ETX may refer to:
 ETX (form factor), Embedded Technology eXtended computer-on-module specification
 Meade ETX telescope, popular line of compact Maksutov-Cassegrain telescopes made by Meade Instruments Corporation
 End-of-text character, character code within the C0 and C1 control codes range
 Expected Transmission Count, network routing metric